Jai Mangal Kanojiya is an Indian politician and a member of the 17th Legislative Assembly of Uttar Pradesh of India. He represents Maharajganj and is a member of the Bharatiya Janata Party.

Early life and education
Kanojiya was born 3 February 1976 in Maharajganj District, Uttar Pradesh to Gabbu Prasad Jaimangal Kanojiya. He belongs to the Dhobi cast 
 scheduled caste and is an agriculturist by profession.

Political career
Kanojiya ran in the 17th Legislative Assembly of Uttar Pradesh (2017) elections as a member of the Bharatiya Janata Party. He was elected to represent Maharajganj, defeating Bahujan Samaj Party candidate Nirmesh Mangal by a margin of 68,361 votes (27.95℅).

Controversy
In April 2018, a video of Kanojiya gambling and drinking at Tiger Resort Casino in Rupendahi District, Nepal was made public.

Posts held

References

Uttar Pradesh MLAs 2017–2022
Bharatiya Janata Party politicians from Uttar Pradesh
Living people
People from Maharajganj district
1976 births
Uttar Pradesh MLAs 2022–2027